Rosebank is a demolished station in the Rosebank neighborhood along the abandoned South Beach Branch of the Staten Island Railway. It had two tracks and two side platforms, and was located along Tilson Place between Virginia Avenue and St. Mary's Avenue.

History
As part of a grade crossing elimination project on the South Beach Branch, the grade crossing at St. Mary's Avenue was eliminated, and the station was rebuilt in the fall of 1937. This structure remained in place until well after the branch's abandonment in 1953. There was an overpass at the new station connecting the two platforms. At Clifton Avenue, there was
a pedestrian underpass which ran underground beneath the tracks that was built in 1937. This underpass was frequently used by students from Public School 13. The two buildings of P.S. 13 were later on replaced with one building, which stands on the South Beach Branch right-of-way.

This station was abandoned when the SIRT discontinued passenger service on the South Beach Branch to Wentworth Avenue at midnight on March 31, 1953 because of city-operated bus competition.

Previously, south of the station at Hylan Boulevard, there was an overpass, that has been filled in since the line was abandoned. The Virginia Avenue trestle was demolished in 1999.

There is also discussion of building a station nearby on the SIR Main Line which would bridge the longest gap between two stations (Grasmere and Clifton). This proposed station could be named Rosebank.

References

South Beach Branch stations
1886 establishments in New York (state)
Railway stations in the United States opened in 1886
Railway stations closed in 1953
1953 disestablishments in New York (state)